Smiljan Radic (born June 21, 1965, Santiago) is an internationally recognised Chilean architect of Croatian heritage. Radic graduated in 1989 in architecture at the Catholic University of Chile and established his own office in 1995. Many of his projects are small scale, such as dwellings and installation designs that bridge across various cultural traditions. Radic was selected to design the 2014 Serpentine Gallery Pavilion in London.

Selected works

Drops, art installation in Baška, Croatia, 2020
Bus Stop in Krumbach, Austria, 2014
Serpentine Gallery Pavilion 2014, London, UK
 VIK Winery 2014, Millahue, Chile
 House for the Poem of the Right Angle, Vilches, Chile 2010-2012
 Mestizo Restaurant Santiago, Chile, 2005-2007
 House A Vilches, Chile, 2008
 Copper House 2, Talca, Chile 2004 - 2005
 Pite House, Papudo, Fifth Region, Chile 2003 - 2005

References

External links

 VIK winery homepage

Chilean architects
1965 births
Living people